Kanagasabapathy Kailasapathy (5 April 1933 – 6 December 1982) was a Sri Lankan journalist and academic. He was the first president of the Jaffna Campus of the University of Sri Lanka.

Early life and family
Kailasapathy was born on 5 April 1933 in Kuala Lumpur, Malaya. His family moved from Malaya to Ceylon. He was then educated at the Jaffna Hindu College and Royal College, Colombo. After school he joined the University of Ceylon, Peradeniya. Whilst at Peradeniya Kailasapathy wrote for Virakesari and Tholkappiyam. He then went to University of Birmingham from where he obtained a Phd after producing a thesis on Tamil heroic poetry in 1968.

Kailasapathy married Sarvamangalam, daughter of N. Manicka Idaikaddar. They had two daughters.

Career
After university Kailasapathy joined Lake House as a journalist.

Kailasapathy then left journalism to take up a career in academia. He served as president of the Jaffna Campus of the University of Sri Lanka between August 1974 and July 1977.

Kailasapathy wrote numerous articles and more than ten books during his life.

Death
Kailasapathy died on 6 December 1982 at the Colombo General Hospital.

References

1933 births
1982 deaths
Alumni of Jaffna Hindu College
Alumni of Royal College, Colombo
Alumni of the University of Birmingham
Alumni of the University of Ceylon
People associated with the University of Sri Lanka
Sri Lankan Tamil academics
Sri Lankan Tamil editors
Sri Lankan Tamil journalists
Sri Lankan Tamil writers
Sri Lankan people of Malaysian descent